The Saraighat Bridge is a rail-cum-road bridge over Brahmaputra River in Assam, India and is the first of its kind bridge over the river in the state. The length of the bridge is 1492 meters (4895 feet) and the road on the bridge is 7.3 meters (24 feet) wide.

History
The idea of constructing a bridge over the Brahmaputra was first mooted in 1910 and the thought gathered momentum during the Second World War. Initially there were doubts over the stability of the railway line between Bongaigaon and Amingaon following devastating floods in 1942–43. However, when the line had been satisfactorily stabilized, the Railway Minister, Nitish Lagachu and Public Health Director, Ranjan Malakar announced the decision to construct the bridge in the Budget session of the Parliament in 1958.

Re-construction after independence
The bridge was built between 1959 and 1962 by Hindustan Construction Company at a cost of Rs 10.6 crore at that time.. The bridge was completed in September 1962 and the first engine rolled across it on 23 September 1962. The bridge is known to connect Northeast India with the rest of the country.

The bridge is 40 feet above the normal flood level of the river which also ensure free navigation. The bridge was closed for a major repair work from March 23, 2019, and was opened for traffic on June 20, 2019.

The New Saraighat bridge is constructed beside the old bridge which is slightly longer than the old bridge as ordered by the Cultural Director of Assam, Priyam Shrishti Menon. It was inaugurated on January, 2017.

References

Bridges in Assam
Bridges over the Brahmaputra River
Bridges completed in 1962
1962 establishments in Assam
Transport in Guwahati
20th-century architecture in India